Hinglaj (Devanagari: हिंगलाज) is an important Hindu pilgrimage place in Balochistan, Pakistan and Kuldevi of many Rajput, Charan, Rajpurohits and other Hindu Communities of India. It is situated in Balochistan province about 250 km west-northwest of Karachi. The Shri Hinglaj Mata mandir which is the largest Hindu pilgrimage centre in Pakistan is located here.

Theological origin
To still the divine dance, Tandava, of the Hindu god Lord Shiva following the death of Dakshayani, the Hindu god Lord Vishnu scattered the remains of her embodiment over various places of the Indian subcontinent. It is said that the head fell at Hingula or Hinglaj and is thus considered the most important of the 51 Shakti Peeths. At each of the Peeths, Bhairava (a manifestation of Shiva) accompanies the relics. The Bhairava at Hinglaj is called Bhimalochana, located in Koteshwar, Kutch. The Sanskrit texts mention the part as 'Brahmadreya' or vital essence.

Geographical location 

Hinglaj is situated in the Balochistan province of Pakistan.  It is near the peak of one of the mountains of the Makran Coastal Range. It is approximately 120 km from the Indus River Delta and 20 km from the Arabian Sea. The area is extremely arid and the pilgrimage also called 'Nani ki Haj' by local Muslims takes place before summer. The pilgrimage starts at a place near the Hao river which is 10 km from Karachi.

The name of Hinglaj lends itself to the Hingol river, the largest in Balochistan and the Hingol National Park which at 6,200 square kilometers is the largest in Pakistan.

Since it is located in a desert which is called Marusthal in Sanskrit, the shrine is referred to in holy texts as "Marutirtha Hinglaj" which means Hinglaj, the Shrine of the Desert.

The Makran Coastal Highway linking Karachi with Gwadar runs parallel to Balochistan's Arabian Sea coast. It was built by Frontier Works Organisation and follows the same path which Alexander took when he ended his campaign. The highway has made the pilgrimage and visiting the shrine very convenient.

Social significance
Despite the independence and the increasing Islamic stance of the Pakistani Government and society, Hinglaj has survived and is in fact revered by local Muslims who call it 'Nani ki Mandir'. Muslims offer red or saffron clothes, incense, candles and a sweet preparation called 'Sirini' to the deity. The Muslims protected sites like Hinglaj which are the last vestiges of the Hindu society which once straddled the area.

Hingula means cinnabar (Mercuric Sulphide). It was used in ancient India to cure snakebite and other poisonings and is still employed in traditional medicine. The Goddess Hingula is thus believed to possess powers which can cure poisoning and other diseases.

Pilgrimage
Although the road linking Karachi with the port of Gwadar on the Arabian Sea has shortened the pilgrimage a lot, the ancient path followed for millennia through the Baluch desert is endowed with a unique importance. The very journey on foot is considered a penance to purify oneself before approaching the deity. An account of such a journey is given below.

The pilgrims are led by priests or caretakers of the shrine through the desert. They hold a wooden trident in their hands. The trident or Trishul is the weapon of Lord Shiva and hence is associated with the Sati too. Since they hold the trident during the trip, they are called 'Chhadidaars' (those who hold the stick or chhadi). The Chhadi is draped with saffron, red or pink coloured fabrics.

The priests give a saffron cloth to every pilgrim and an oath is taken that each would help the other. However they are warned not to share their personal stores of water. This act is deemed to be a sort of fast and penance necessary for the journey.

On the path to the shrine are situated wells which are guarded by the local tribesmen. Feuds over water, a scarce commodity, is common in the area. The tribesmen are offered food consisting primarily of Roti (circular flat disks of baked flour) in lieu of water.

Baba Chandrakup
An important stop during the pilgrimage is the mud volcano called 'Chandragup', literally 'Moon Well'), mainland Asia's largest mud volcano. It is considered holy and is addressed as 'Baba Chandrakup'(literally Father Moonwell). The volcano is filled with mud, instead of magma, hence the term "mud volcano". It is considered to be the abode of demigod Babhaknath. It is one of the few sites of active volcanic activity in the Asian mainland. The mud is semi fluid and sometimes it spills over and aggregates and cools into hillocks which surround the site.

Pilgrims stay up all night at the base of the volcano making Rotis which are offered to the volcano. The activity is considered to be very holy. The ingredients, flour, ghee (clarified butter), jaggery, sugar are mixed on a cloth which is held at all times at four corners by pilgrims. This is done to ensure that it never touches the ground. The prepared rotis are covered with wood.

At daybreak, the Rotis are carried by the pilgrims and priests to the mouth of the crater. A Chadi or Wooden Trident is planted near the edge of the crater and offerings of incense and cannabis are made along with recitation of 'mantras'. The rotis are then torn up and cast into the crater.

After this ritual every pilgrim is asked to confess his sins and ask for forgiveness. Anyone who refuses or hesitates to confess to his or her sins is ostracised and abandoned by the party. After the confession, the party proceeds with the permission of 'Baba Chandrakup'.

Reaching the shrine
The pilgrimage continues for another four to five days after leaving Chandrakup. The final stop is a small village with wooden houses. It is home to the caretakers of the shrine and Baluch tribesmen who revere the deity even though they are Muslims. Before entering the shrine, the pilgrims bathe in the Hingol River (also called the Aghore River). The shrine is situated on the mountain on the other bank of the river. The pilgrims bathe and visit the shrine in their wet clothes.

Shrine's mark
The shrine is recognised by a mark which resembles the sun and the moon.  This mark is upon a giant boulder at the top of the hill containing the cave.  It is believed that the Hindu god Lord Ram created this mark with the strike of his arrow after his penance ended.

Shrine 

The shrine is called 'Mahal', a word of Arabic origin which means palace. The natural beauty of the shrine has spawned folklore that it was constructed by demigods called 'Yakshas'.  The walls and roof of the cave are encrusted with colourful stones and semi-precious veins.  The floor is also multi hued.

The entrance to the cave is around 50 feet in height.  At the end of the cave is the sanctum sanctorum, which houses the holy relic.  It is covered by red clothes and vermilion.  There are two entrances to the sanctum.  One has to crawl into the sanctum, take the 'darshan' and leave through the other opening. Prasad is distributed to the pilgrims and they return after seeing the Milky Way at 
night.

Hingula Pithas 
Although the Hingula shrine in Balochistan is considered to be a true Shakti Peeth, other shrines dedicated to the goddess exist in India and Sri Lanka. One important shrine is located 14 km from Talcher in the state of Orissa in India. King Nala of the Vidarbha region of Western India was an ardent devotee of Devi Hingula. He was approached by the King of Puri for help. In order to start cooking 'Mahaprasada' for Lord Jagannath he had to procure Devi Hingula as fire for the temple kitchen. The Goddess agreed and moved to Puri as fire.

Kuldevi
Hinglaj Devi worshiped as Kuldevi by many communities of India like all sindhi's Bhavsar, Rajputs, Charan, Rajpurohit, Khatri 
Dodiya Rajput, Parajiya Soni,  Hingu, Bhanushali, Lohana, Barot, Kapdi, Vanza, Bhadresa, Gurjar etc.

As per the popular folklore of Treta Yuga, a virtuous Haihaya king of Mahishmati of malwa region, Sahastrabahu Arjuna or Sahastararjun, more widely known as Kartavirya Arjuna drunk with power and sense of invincibility ends up killing the great Brahman sage Jamadagni over a sacred cow Kamadhenu. Furious at this heinous crime, son of Jamadagni, Lord Parashurama vows to vanquish the power drunken Kshatriya clan from Earth. Wielding his divine axe, he eliminates Sahastararjun and later on he rages on earth 21 times, each time decimating unvirtuous and unworthy kings wherever he went. Terrified with the prospect of death at Lord Parashuram, progeny of Sahastararjun seek Janaka Maharaj, one of the most learned king of Videha who advises them to seek Hinglaji Mata's blessing. The clan devotedly pray to devi at Higloj who is overcome with compassion and assures shelter in her place. Over time, when Lord Parashuram visits this place, he was pleasantly surprised to see Kshatriya clan involved in many Brahminical activities having shed their arms. Hinglaj mata intervenes on their behalf, and since then the clan disowned arms. Lord Parashuram not only taught them scriptures and vedas, but also weaving for a living. The clan with a sense of relief then branches out and spread across Sindh, Panjab, Rajasthan, Madhya Pradesh, and later on to South India, such as Maharashtra, Telangana, Andrapradesh and Karnataka. And where ever they went they continued worshiping Hinglaj Devi. Chandraseniya Kayastha Prabhus and Khatris trace their origin to this prehistoric lineage. Some of those who remained in Sindh province later on converted to Islam. Also, to this day many work as weavers and tailors.
AmbaBhavani or Jagadamba is considered as one of the later incarnations of Hinglaj Devi by the same communities who also worship her mostly in Western India.

In popular media
Hinglaj Shaktipeeth was backdrop for the 2013 Telugu Film Sahasam starring Gopichand and Taapsee Pannu and Shakti Kapoor. The protagonist  in fictional story belongs to a family migrated from present day Pakistan during partition. He visits Pakistan to fetch his ancestral property, which was left in Pakistan.

In Bengali there is a very popular film named "Marutirtha Hinglaj" directed by Bikash Roy.

She is worshiped as Kuldevi by many Anavil Brahmin, Kshatriya & other Hindu communities of India like Khatri Brahmakshatriya, Bhavsar, Bhanushali, Lohana, Kapdi, Kapadiya, Charan (deviputra), etc.

See also

 Hinduism in Pakistan
 Hinglaj Mata
 Kalat Kali Temple
 Katasraj temple
 Multan Sun Temple
 Prahladpuri Temple, Multan
 Sadh Belo
 Shivaharkaray
 Shiv Mandir, Umerkot
 Shri Varun Dev Mandir
 Tilla Jogian

Notes

References
 Overseas Pakistan Foundation
 
 Marutirtha Hinglaj
 Mr. Jay Shah's road trip to Hinglaj (Video on Vimeo)
 4×4 Offroaders Club of Karachi - Visit to Hinglaj & mud-volcano
 Hingula worship in Orissa
 Hinglaj Devi: Identity, Change, and Solidification at a Hindu Temple in Pakistan

Hinduism in Balochistan, Pakistan
History of Balochistan
Lasbela District
Charan